Inverchoran is a small remote hamlet, situated in the upper reaches of Strathconon, in Ross-shire, in the Highland council area of Scotland. It is on the Strathconon Estate, 1 km east of Loch Beannacharain, near where the Allt Gleann Chorainn joins the River Meig.

Inverchoran is 40 km west of the city of Inverness. The village of Achnasheen lies 12 km miles to the northwest, but the only direct route is by a hill path.

Hill Walking
Inverchoran is the starting point for a number of hill walks. These include the Corbetts of Bac an Eich and An Sidhean, and the Graham of Beinn Mheadhoinn.

References

Populated places in Ross and Cromarty